Edson Fernando da Silva Gomes (born 24 April 1998), simply known as Edson, is a Brazilian footballer who plays as a defensive midfielder for Atlético Goianiense on loan from Rukh Lviv.

Club career
Edson was born in Natal, Rio Grande do Norte, and was an Alecrim youth graduate. He made his first team debut on 19 April 2015, five days shy of his 18th birthday, by coming on as a half-time substitute in a 2–1 Campeonato Potiguar home win against Santa Cruz.

In March 2017, Edson moved to Vitória on loan, returning to the youth setup. He subsequently played for the under-20 squad of Votuporanguense before returning to his parent club for the 2018 season, where he featured sparingly in the year's Campeonato Potiguar.

Ahead of the 2019 campaign, Edson moved to Globo, being mainly utilized as a right back. In April of that year, he agreed to a one-year deal with Bahia, being initially assigned to the under-23 squad.

On 29 May 2020, after winning the 2020 Campeonato Baiano with the under-23 squad, Edson renewed his contract until December 2021, and was definitely promoted to the main squad. He made his Série A debut on 3 September, replacing Elton late into a 3–5 home loss against Flamengo.

Career statistics

Honours
Bahia
Campeonato Baiano: 2020
Copa do Nordeste: 2021

 Atlético Goianiense
Campeonato Goiano: 2022

References

External links
 
Bahia profile 

1998 births
Living people
People from Natal, Rio Grande do Norte
Brazilian footballers
Association football midfielders
Campeonato Brasileiro Série A players
Alecrim Futebol Clube players
Globo Futebol Clube players
Esporte Clube Bahia players
FC Rukh Lviv players
Atlético Clube Goianiense players
Brazilian expatriate footballers
Expatriate footballers in Ukraine
Brazilian expatriate sportspeople in Ukraine
Sportspeople from Rio Grande do Norte